Vargashi is the name of several inhabited localities in Kurgan Oblast, Russia.

Urban localities
Vargashi (urban-type settlement), an urban-type settlement in Vargashinsky District

Rural localities
Vargashi (rural locality), a selo in Vargashinsky Selsoviet of Vargashinsky District